Novy Liman is a rural locality (a selo) and the administrative center of Novolimanskoye Rural Settlement, Petropavlovsky District, Voronezh Oblast, Russia. The population was 484 as of 2010. There are 3 streets.

Geography 
Novy Liman is located 21 km south of Petropavlovka (the district's administrative centre) by road. Progoreloye is the nearest rural locality.

References 

Rural localities in Petropavlovsky District, Voronezh Oblast
Bogucharsky Uyezd